Operation Hades may refer to:

 Operation Hades, which resulted in the Plutonium affair in Germany
 Operation Hades, part of Operation Ranch Hand during the Vietnam war
 Operation Hades, an expansion pack of Fantasy Flight game Dust Tactics